Nowe Leśne Bohatery  is a village in the administrative district of Gmina Lipsk, within Augustów County, Podlaskie Voivodeship, in north-eastern Poland, close to the border with Belarus.

Name 
There is also a settlement Polnyja Bahatyry on the Belarusian side of the border.

References

Villages in Augustów County